Volzhsky Utyos is a rural locality (a settlement) in Shigonsky District of Samara Oblast, Russia. Population:  The settlement is the administrative center of Volzhsky Utyos Rural Settlement, one of the municipal formations of Shigonsky District. It was formed around the sanatorium of the same name.

References

Rural localities in Samara Oblast